Murshidabad College of Engineering & Technology (MCET), is a college located in Berhampore, West Bengal, India. It offers Bachelor of Technology (B.Tech.) at the undergraduate level operated under Maulana Abul Kalam Azad University of Technology, affiliated to All India Council for Technical Education (AICTE).

The college was established in 1998 with the approval of AICTE and affiliated to Kalyani University with 120 students in 3 disciplines. After six months, it was shifted to its own campus where the Laboratories, Workshops, Classrooms, Library, Computer Centers and Hostels are all currently located.

History 
The college was established with the help of Mr. Nripen Chowdhury, the then Sabhadhipati, Murshidabad Zill Parisad. On 8 August 1998 the formal inauguration was made by Dr. Asim Dasgupta, Ex- Minister-in-Charge, Finance, Govt. of West Bengal. The college was shifted to its present location and was formally started on 4 August 2001, by Mr. Buddhadeb Bhattacharjee, the then Hon'ble Chief Minister of West Bengal, This college getting financial help from TEQUIP.

Courses offered
B Tech:
Engineering - Civil Engineering
Engineering - Computer Science Engineering
Engineering - Information Technology It is stop after 2017,
Engineering - Electronics and Communication Engineering
Engineering - Electrical Engineering
BCA
BBA

Campus
The campus is located at Banjethia, around 5 km away from Berhampore, the district town of Murshidabad district, West Bengal, India.

Library
The institute possesses a library with textbooks, reference books, handbooks, Magazines, Journals, periodicals, etc. which has 11,000 books exclusively for B.Tech. students. There is a facility of "Book-bank" for SC/ST students sponsored by the Government of West Bengal.

See also

References

External links
 Handbook of Universities - Page 441
 West Bengal, beyond the millennium: essays in honour of Professor ... - Page 147
 1999 IEEE 13th International Conference on Dielectric Liquids
 Directory Of Libraries In India3rd Rev. Ed. Vol# 2 - Page 775
 Intro. to Linear & Digital Control Systems - Arun K Ghosh, Former Principal, MCET
 Intro. to Measurement & Instrumentation - Arun K Ghosh, Former Principal, MCET
 Introduction to Instrumentation and Control - Arun K Ghosh, Former Principal, MCET
 The city of Berhampore
 Schools in Murshidabad

Colleges affiliated to West Bengal University of Technology
Engineering colleges in West Bengal
Universities and colleges in Murshidabad district
Educational institutions established in 1998
1998 establishments in West Bengal